Canadian Aboriginal law is the body of law of Canada that concerns a variety of issues related to Indigenous peoples in Canada. Canadian Aboriginal Law is different from Canadian Indigenous law: In Canada, Indigenous Law refers to the legal traditions, customs, and practices of Indigenous peoples and groups.   Aboriginal peoples as a collective noun is a specific term of art used in legal documents, including the Constitution Act, 1982,  and includes First Nations, Inuit and Métis people. Canadian Aboriginal law provides certain constitutionally recognized rights to land and traditional practices. Canadian Aboriginal Law enforces and interprets certain treaties between the Crown and Indigenous people, and manages much of their interaction. A major area of Aboriginal law involves the duty to consult and accommodate.

Sources

Aboriginal law 
Aboriginal law is based on a variety of written and unwritten legal sources. The Royal Proclamation of 1763 is the foundation document creating special land rights for Indigenous peoples within Canada (which was called "Quebec" in 1763).

Section 91(24) of the Constitution Act, 1867 gives the federal parliament exclusive power to legislate in matters related to "Indians, and Lands reserved for the Indians". Under this power, that legislative body has enacted the Indian Act, First Nations Land Management Act, Indian Oil and Gas Act, Department of Crown-Indigenous Relations and Northern Affairs Act and the Department of Indigenous Services Act.

Part II of the Constitution Act, 1982, recognizes Aboriginal treaty and land rights, with section 35 being particularly important. Section 35's recognition of Aboriginal rights refers to an ancient source of Aboriginal rights in custom.

Indigenous law 

Canadian Indigenous law refers to Indigenous peoples own legal systems. This includes the laws and legal processes developed by Indigenous groups to govern their relationships, manage their natural resources, and manage conflicts. Indigenous law is developed from a variety of sources and institutions which differ across legal traditions.

Indigenous self government

Treaties

Act

Aboriginal land title in Canada

See also 

The Canadian Crown and Indigenous peoples
Indian Health Transfer Policy (Canada)
Numbered Treaties
Cree law, an example of Indigenous Law
Jack Woodward

References

Bibliography

External links
A Brief Introduction to Aboriginal Law in Canada (Bill Henderson Barrister & Solicitor)
A Guide to Canadian Indigenous Law (Jack Woodward, Q.C. Lawyer and Author)
The Native Law Centre of Canada (University of Saskatchewan) 

Canadian Aboriginal and indigenous law
Indigenous politics in Canada
Indigenous law